Po Leung Kuk Celine Ho Yam Tong College is a secondary school located in the Po Kong Village Road School Village in Tsz Wan Shan, Kowloon, Hong Kong. Established in 2001, it was the thirteenth secondary school to open in Po Leung Kuk.

In the first year of opening, the Po Kong Village Road School Village was not fully completed. It borrowed the campus (the third to fourth floors) of Sir Ellis Kadoorie Secondary School in 22 Hoi Fan Road in Tai Kok Tsui, Western Kowloon. In the activity day of the same academic year, the school announced the renaming of the school from 'Po Leung Kuk Tsz Wan Shan School' to 'Po Leung Kuk Celine Ho Yam Tong School'. After the construction of the School Village was completed, the school was moved into the new campus and commenced teaching on 1September 2002.

See also
Po Leung Kuk No.1 W. H. Cheung College

External links

School Website

Secondary schools in Hong Kong
Tsz Wan Shan
Po Leung Kuk